Beyond the Pale is a 1999 immigrant drama set in mid-1980s New York, directed by George Bazala and starring Patrick Clarke, Malachy McCourt and Roger Davis.

Plot
Two Irish men, Patrick Shaw (Patrick Clarke) and Seamus O'Sullivan (Conn Horgan), enter the U.S. illegally. Landing in New York the pair start out with dreams of making it big but soon find themselves in dead-end jobs and drifting apart. As Seamus pursues various get rich quick schemes, the more cautious Patrick holds down a janitors job and plays good Samaritan to washed up alcoholic author Tom Finnegan (Malachy McCourt). Along the way Patrick falls for Helen (Beverley Elder), a struggling actress entangled in a messy break up with Jeffrey (Roger Davis). Everything comes to a head when Seamus turns to backroom gambling, Tom hits rock bottom and Jeffrey makes a vicious play to win Helen back.

Development
Beyond the Pale began its life at a table in the Film Centre Cafe in Hells Kitchen NYC in June 1996 when George Bazala and Patrick Clarke thrashed out an idea based on the life of an Irish immigrant in late 1980s New York City. The pair had just finished working together on 'Fall from Grace' a Hunter College grad thesis short film. Work on the script was completed in August 1996, NYU film grad Jack Alvino signed on as co-producer and Maiden Voyage Pictures was formed to seek finance for filming. Preparations got underway to shoot the film's opening segment in Clarke's hometown of Dublin, Ireland. This would prove to be an extremely ambitious undertaking considering they had only raised US$20,000. Clarke flew to Dublin on December 2, 1996, to make preparations for the arrival of the crew and to scout and secure locations and equipment. A week later, Bazala flew in to audition actors. By the time Alvino and the rest of the crew arrived, everything was miraculously in place. The tight five-day shooting schedule with a skeleton crew proved extremely tough. Clarke's friends and relatives were drafted in to help with everything from catering to horse wrangling. On 19 December, the opening eleven minutes of Beyond the Pale was in the can.

Bazala recalled, “We were all very anxious to see the results of our adventure in Dublin. Unfortunately, we would have to wait until February 1997, when we had raised the funds to process, sync and transfer the film. It was mid-March before editor Michael Sullivan had completed a rough cut. We couldn’t have been happier with the outcome”. Beyond the Pale had its world premiere at the Galway Film Fleadh on 5 July 1999 and its US premiere at the 33rd Houston International Film Festival (9 April 2000) where it won for best dramatic feature film.

Cast
Patrick Clarke as Patrick Shaw
Malachy McCourt as Tom Finegan
Conn Horgan as Seamus O'Sullivan
Beverley Elder as Helen
Roger Davis as Jeffrey
Ruth Miller as Miss Mooney
Valentina Olmos as Conchita
Brian Mallon as The Cop
Iris Braydon as Lily
Worth Howe as Mr Arnold
William Stone Mahoney as Gambler
Neale Harper as Bob
Catherine Natale as Margie 
Jason Killalee as Sean
Tom Finegan as Man on Street (Cameo)
Eric Mabius as Brian (Cameo)

Awards
Beyond the Pale won for best drama at the 2000 Houston Film Festival.

Filming locations
Dublin, Ireland
Manhattan, New York
Brooklyn, New York
Queens, New York
Staten Island, New York

References

External links
 
Beyond the Pale trailer

2000 films
American biographical films
Irish biographical films
English-language Irish films
2000s English-language films
2000s American films